The Gateway Expressway is a toll road under construction in Pinellas County, Florida that is expected to be completed in late 2023 at a cost of $598 million. The project consists of two branches: an elevated highway to be designated State Road 690 (SR 690) above 118th Avenue North between Interstate 275 (I-275) and U.S. Highway 19 (US 19) and a raised highway in the median of SR 686 from 118th Avenue North to the Bayside Bridge. Construction was approved in February 2014 and began in November 2017.

Route description 
The Gateway Expressway consists of two connected segments:
 A four-lane, elevated segment will run above 118th Avenue from US 19 to I-275. This section will be designated SR 690.
 A raised, four lane expressway will be built in the median of SR 686 and carry the designation SR 686A. This segment will run from the planned SR 690 segment north to the Bayside Bridge and connect to St. Petersburg–Clearwater International Airport.

Both segments will be tolled using electronic toll gantries for SunPass transponders or pay-by-plate billing.

The project includes express lanes on I-275 from south of Gandy Boulevard to 4th Street North, where they will meet express lanes under construction as part of the new Howard Frankland bridge project.

History 

The intention of the Gateway Expressway project is to solve transportation problems in Pinellas County, where several expressway projects were cancelled in the 1970s and 1980s, leaving the county without any major limited-access thoroughfares except for I-275. Significant upgrades to US 19 in the 2000s improved traffic flow north–south in the county. However, only local roads travel east–west. The Gateway Expressway project had been identified for a long time as a priority project to improve traffic flow in Pinellas County.

The project was announced by Governor Rick Scott in a press conference with local officials on February 17, 2014. It had been in the works for 15 years. Construction began in November 2017 and is expected to be complete in late 2023 at a cost of $598 million. The project was not expected to be funded for another 15–20 years. Funding will be provided by the Federal Highway Administration ($153 million), Penny for Pinellas funds ($53 million), and the State of Florida (remainder of project costs).

Major intersections

State Road 690

State Road 686A express lanes

See also

References 

Expressways in Pinellas County, Florida
Roads in Pinellas County, Florida
Toll roads in Florida
State highways in Florida
Expressways in the Tampa Bay area